Vargön is a locality situated in Vänersborg Municipality, Västra Götaland County, Sweden with 4,919 inhabitants in 2010. Vargön is noted for Vargön Alloys, a producer of iron alloys.

References 

Populated places in Vänersborg Municipality
Populated places in Västra Götaland County